Crana is a village and former municipality in the district of Locarno in the canton of Ticino, Switzerland.

In 1995 the municipality was merged with the other, neighboring municipalities Comologno and Russo to form a new and larger municipality Onsernone.

History
Crana is first mentioned in 1228 as Grana.  In 1265 it was mentioned as Crana.

During the Ancien Régime, Crana belonged to the Squadra of Crana which included the territory of Vocaglia, Comologno and Spruga, and was part of the old municipality of Onsernone.  The modern village was created during the institutional changes of the Act of Mediation in 1803.  Crana is known for the over 5,000 holders of heimatrecht in the village.  The heimatrecht is similar to place of birth in other countries, and the heimatort is used on Swiss passports.  A person maintains their heimatort regardless of whether they have ever lived in the municipality.  The reason for the high number of heimatrecht holders is that the village sold the heimatrecht, which conferred local citizenry (and thus Swiss citizenship) to help make up for the low village income.

The parish was created in 1787 when the village split away from the Russo parish.  The Church of SS Peter and Paul was built in 1676.

The present population is made up of retirees and commuters who work in the Onsernone valley and in the agglomeration of Locarno.

Historic population
The historical population is given in the following table:

References

Former municipalities of Ticino
Villages in Onsernone